The somewhat vaguely defined term dolman (from Turkish dolaman "robe" ) can refer to various types of clothing, all of which have sleeves and cover the top part of the body, and sometimes more.  Originally, the term dolaman referred to a long and loose garment with narrow sleeves and an opening in the front. Generally worn by Turks, it resembled a cassock in shape.

Military dolman
The dolman entered Western culture via Hungary starting in the sixteenth and continuing on into the nineteenth centuries where Hungarian hussars developed it into an item of formal military dress uniform.  The jacket was cut tight and short, and decorated with passementerie throughout.  Under this was worn an embroidered shirt that was cut tightly to the waist and beneath which it the shirt flared out into a skirt that sometimes reached nearly to the knee in the csakora-style. A decorated saber or sword hung from a barrel sash around the waist.  The elaborate style of dress came to reflect cultural values with regard to romantic military patriotism. 

A second garment called a pelisse was frequently worn over it: a similar coat but with fur trimming, most often worn slung over the left shoulder with the sleeves (if any) hanging loose.

Fashionable dolman

A dolman is also an outer garment worn by ladies, with wide cape like arrangements instead of sleeves. It was a favourite style of mantle worn by fashionable women in the 1870s and 1880s.

A dolman sleeve is a sleeve set into a very low armscye; in fact, the armscye may extend to the waistline, in which case there will be no underarm seam in the blouse. Dolman sleeves were very popular in ladies clothing during the US Civil War. They had the effect of making the shoulders look sloped, therefore minimizing the appearance of the waist. The early 21st century dolman sleeve describes a sleeve cut as one with the bodice, which can taper to the wrist or be cut widely.

Gallery

References

Coats (clothing)
History of Asian clothing
History of clothing (Western fashion)
Ottoman clothing
Robes and cloaks
Turkish words and phrases